Manel Yaakoubi (born June 25, 1992 in Chlef) is an Algerian volleyball player.

Club information
Current club :  Nedjmet Chlef

Previous club :  Ghalia Chlef

References

1992 births
Living people
People from Chlef
Algerian women's volleyball players
Wing spikers
21st-century Algerian people